Young Jock may refer to:

 Jock Young - criminologist
 Yung Joc - hiphop artist